Milon may refer to:

First name
 Milo of Croton, ancient Greek wrestler
 Milo governor of Taranto (fr), general under the command of Pyrrhus of Epirus.
 St. Milon (c. 1158), bishop of Thérouanne in Artois
 St. Milon (c. 730), monk of Abbaye de Saint-Wandrille at Fontenelle
 Milon (fr) (died 1104) French cardinal of Saint-Aubin
 Milon, Welsh knight in 13th-century medieval romance Lai de Milon by Marie de France

Surname 
 Titus Annius Milo, Roman senator, defended by Cicero in Pro Milone
 :fr:Bertrand Milon (15th century), French diplomat, founder of the University of Nantes ;
 :fr:Joseph Milon (19th century), French painter
 Louis Milon (18th century), French dancer
 :fr:Michaël Milon, French karateka
 Le Père Milon, story by Guy de Maupassant

Places 
Milon-la-Chapelle, commune in Yvelines (78).
La Ferté-Milon, commune of l'Aisne.

Other
 AONS Milon, Greek sport club
 Milon's Secret Castle, a NES videogame about a character named Milon